Dinar District is a district of Afyonkarahisar Province of Turkey. Its seat is the town Dinar. Its area is 1,254 km2, and its population is 47,378 (2021).

Composition
There are three municipalities in Dinar District:
 Dinar
 Haydarlı
 Tatarlı

There are 60 villages in Dinar District:

 Afşar
 Akça
 Akçin
 Akgün
 Akpınarlı
 Aktoprak
 Alacaatlı
 Alparslan
 Avdan
 Bademli
 Bağcılar
 Belenpınar
 Bilgiç
 Bülüçalan
 Burunkaya
 Çağlayan
 Çakıcı
 Çamlı
 Çapalı
 Çayüstü
 Cerityaylası
 Çiçektepe
 Çobansaray
 Cumhuriyet
 Çürüklü
 Dikici
 Doğanlı
 Dombay
 Dumanköy
 Eldere
 Ergenli
 Gençali
 Göçerli
 Gökçeli
 Kabaklı
 Kadılar
 Karabedir
 Karahacılı
 Karakuyu
 Karataş
 Kazanpınar
 Keklicek
 Kınık
 Kızıllı
 Körpeli
 Okçular
 Palaz
 Pınarlı
 Sütlaç
 Tekin
 Tuğaylı
 Uluköy
 Yakaköy
 Yapağılı
 Yelalan
 Yeşilçat
 Yeşilhüyük
 Yeşilyurt
 Yıprak
 Yüksel

References

External links
 District governor's official website 

Districts of Afyonkarahisar Province